Mykolayiv Shipyard is a major shipyard owned by state and located in Mykolaiv, Ukraine. In modern times, the shipyard has been most commonly referred to as Mykolayiv North Shipyard. Until 2017, it was known as the Shipyard named after 61 Communards.

History 
The following year the first 44-gun frigate, St. Nicholas, was launched. In 1827-1829 the neighboring Kherson Admiralty was closed down and transferred to be merged with one in Nikolaev (Mykolaiv). In 1851, Admiral M.P. Lazarev ordered the first considerable reconstruction of the shipyard.

In 1910 the government decided to stop building battleships and close the shipyard, but it was reopened in the following year as the French-owned Russian Shipbuilding Corporation (Russud). The name Russud comes from combining the word Russian and the word Sudostroitel'nyj (lit. Shipbuilding).

Between 1911 and 1914, two building berths with slip-ways, an assembling and welding workshop, a number of buildings and an outfitting wharf were built on the left bank of the Ingul River.

Early in the Soviet era, the shipyard was renamed to the Andre Marti (North) Yard. In 1931, the shipyard was named after 61 Communards. From then on, torpedo-boats, destroyers, light cruisers, submarines; naval supply vessels, including rescue vessels of various purposes equipped with deep-water operation systems were built. It was named Shipyard No. 200 (in the name of 61 Communards) on 30 December 1936 and was renumbered as Shipyard No. 445 when it reopened after the end of World War II.

Facilities and Services 

Production capacities of the shipyard are concentrated in 286 industrial buildings and 165 industrial structures.

Soviet-built ships

Cruisers
 Kronshtadt-class battlecruiser: 1 (along with Admiralty Shipyard)
 Kara-class cruiser: 7 (whole class)
 Slava-class cruiser: 4 (whole class)

Destroyers
 Skoryy-class destroyer: 18 (all names started with B)

Submarines
 Shchuka-class submarine, Series V-modified: 3
 Shchuka-class submarine, Series V-modified-2: 4
 Shchuka-class submarine, Series X: 8

Notable vessels 
The following vessels were constructed at this shipyard. The list is not all inclusive.

Note: NATO class only shown if applicable; classes of vessels launched before 1949 are provided as originally designated. The name of the ship provided is the name given when launched–some ships may have since been renamed.

Notes

Bibliography

External links 
 State Enterprise "Shipyard named after 61 Communards" Public Website

Buildings and structures in Mykolaiv
Shipbuilding companies of Ukraine
Shipbuilding companies of the Soviet Union
Ukrainian brands
Shipbuilding companies of Imperial Russia
Defence companies of Ukraine
Companies nationalised by the Soviet Union
Ukroboronprom